Blind Lake may refer to:

Blind Lake Township, Cass County, Minnesota
Blind Lake, 65 acres in size at Pinckney State Recreation Area, Michigan 
Blind Lake (novel), of 2003 by American-Canadian science fiction author Robert Charles Wilson